Eva Marie Cruz Dalmau (born January 22, 1974 in Toa Baja, Puerto Rico) is a member of the Puerto Rican national volleyball team. Cruz plays for Valencianas of Juncos in the Puerto Rican league of volleyball. She is for many "La Reina" (the queen) of volleyball in Puerto Rico.

She participated at the 2002 FIVB Volleyball Women's World Championship in Germany.
Cruz was the first player in the Puerto Rico women's volleyball league (Liga de Voleibol Superior Femenino) to have 4,000 points. She reached this mark on February 27, 2009. She reached 2,000 defenses on February 2, 2007, and 200 serves, to become second in league history.

Awards

Individuals
 2006 Central American and Caribbean Games "Best Attacker"

See also
 Volleyball in Puerto Rico

References

External links 
 News
 Profile

1974 births
Living people
Puerto Rican women's volleyball players
People from Toa Baja, Puerto Rico
Volleyball players at the 2007 Pan American Games
Central American and Caribbean Games bronze medalists for Puerto Rico
Competitors at the 2006 Central American and Caribbean Games
Wing spikers
Central American and Caribbean Games medalists in volleyball
Pan American Games competitors for Puerto Rico